Carbon-based may refer to:

 Biology
 based on Carbon
 Carbon-based life
 Carbon chauvinism